Dokmaipa Por Pongsawang was a Thai Muay Thai fighter who competed during the golden era of Muay Thai. He was a two weight Lumpinee Stadium champion.

Biography & career
Chamnien Moonkasorn was born in 1968 in the Selaphum district, Roi Et province where he started Muay Thai training at the age of 9. He fought for the Kiatbanhan gym under the name Detduangnoi Kiatbanhan until the age of 12 when he joined the Por.Pongsawang camp in Bangkok alongside his brothers Tukatathong and Detduang.

Dokmaipa debuted in the major Bangkokg stadiums at the age of 16. He rapidly became a notable champion known for his powerful left leg under the Onesongchai promotion. He won the Lumpinee Stadium titles in the 112 lbs and 115 lbs divisionw in 1987 and 1988, defeating champions Burklerk Pinsinchai, Wisanupon Saksamut and Wangchannoi Sor Palangchai.

At his peak he received purses of more than 120,000 baht. Some of the most notable opponents he defeated were Paruhatlek Sitchunthong, Boonlai Sor.Thanikul, Oley Kiatoneway, Karuhat Sor.Supawan, Nungubon Sitlerchai, Yodkhunpon Sitraipum, Saenklai Sit Kru Od and Kaensak Sor.Ploenjit.

After his fighting career Dokmaipa spent years as a trainer in Macao before returning to live in his native province. On October 6, 2020, Dokmaipa was brought to the hospital following blood infection symptoms caused by a bug bite. He fell into a coma and was pronounced dead on October 7, 2022, at the Kalasin province Hospital.

Titles
Lumpinee Stadium
 1987 Lumpinee Stadium 112 lbs Champion (defended once)
 1988 Lumpinee Stadium 115 lbs Champion

Fight record

|- style="text-align:center; background:#fbb;"
| 1998- ||Loss ||align=left| Tor Patak Wanchalerm || Lumpinee Stadium ||  Bangkok, Thailand  || TKO (Low kicks)||  ||

|- style="text-align:center; background:#fbb;"
| 1997-08-26 ||Loss ||align=left| Singdam Or.Ukrit || Lumpinee Stadium ||  Bangkok, Thailand  || Decision || 5 || 3:00

|- style="text-align:center; background:#cfc;"
| 1996-09-27 || Win ||align=left| Wanpichit Romachiphum|| Lumpinee Stadium ||  Bangkok, Thailand  || KO (Punches)|| 3 ||

|- style="text-align:center; background:#cfc;"
| 1996-03-05 || Win ||align=left| Baiphet Lukjaomaesaivari|| Lumpinee Stadium ||  Bangkok, Thailand  || TKO|| 3 ||

|- style="text-align:center; background:#fbb;"
| 1996-02- || Loss ||align=left| Baiphet Lukjaomaesaivari|| Lumpinee Stadium ||  Bangkok, Thailand  || Decision || 5 || 3:00

|- style="text-align:center; background:#fbb;"
| 1996-01-16 || Loss ||align=left| Baiphet Sor.Sakulpan|| Lumpinee Stadium ||  Bangkok, Thailand  || Decision || 5 || 3:00

|- style="text-align:center; background:#cfc;"
| 1995-11-17 || Win ||align=left| Dao Udon Sor.Suchart || Lumpinee Stadium ||  Bangkok, Thailand  || Decision || 5 || 3:00

|-  style="text-align:center; background:#cfc;"
| 1995-09-30 ||Win ||align=left| Nungubon Sitlerchai || Lumpinee Stadium || Bangkok, Thailand || Decision || 5 || 3:00

|- style="text-align:center; background:#fbb;"
| 1995-08-25 || Loss ||align=left| Karuhat Sor.Supawan  || Lumpinee Stadium ||  Bangkok, Thailand  || Decision || 5 || 3:00

|-  style="text-align:center; background:#fbb;"
| 1995-06-30 ||Loss ||align=left| Nungubon Sitlerchai || Lumpinee Stadium || Bangkok, Thailand || Decision || 5 || 3:00

|- style="text-align:center; background:#cfc;"
| 1995-06-09 || Win ||align=left| Kaensak Sor.Ploenjit || Lumpinee Stadium ||  Bangkok, Thailand  || Decision || 5 || 3:00

|- style="text-align:center; background:#cfc;"
| 1995-04-28 || Win ||align=left| Sornsuknoi Sakwichan || Lumpinee Stadium ||  Bangkok, Thailand  || Decision || 5 || 3:00

|- style="text-align:center; background:#cfc;"
| 1995-03-10 || Win ||align=left| Saenchai Kiatsupattra || Lumpinee Stadium ||  Bangkok, Thailand  || KO (High kick) || 2 ||

|- style="text-align:center; background:#fbb;"
| 1994-11-08 ||Loss ||align=left| Jaoweha Looktapfa || Lumpinee Stadium ||  Bangkok, Thailand  || Decision || 5 || 3:00

|- style="text-align:center; background:#fbb;"
| 1994-08-30 ||Loss ||align=left| Daraek Sitkrungsap || Lumpinee Stadium ||  Bangkok, Thailand  || Decision || 5 || 3:00

|- style="text-align:center; background:#fbb;"
| 1994-08-05 ||Loss ||align=left| Daraek Sitkrungsap || Lumpinee Stadium ||  Bangkok, Thailand  || Decision || 5 || 3:00

|- style="text-align:center; background:#fbb;"
| 1994-05-17 ||Loss ||align=left| Singdam Or.Ukrit || Lumpinee Stadium ||  Bangkok, Thailand  || Decision || 5 || 3:00

|- style="text-align:center; background:#;"
| 1994-03-05 || ||align=left| Baiphet Lukjaomaesaivari|| Lumpinee Stadium ||  Bangkok, Thailand  || Decision || 5 || 3:00

|- style="text-align:center; background:#fbb;"
| 1994-01-06 ||Loss ||align=left| Veeraphol Sahaprom || Rajadamnern Stadium ||  Bangkok, Thailand  || Decision || 5 || 3:00

|-  style="text-align:center; background:#fbb;"
| 1993-11-05|| Loss||align=left| Anantasak Panyuthaphum || Lumpinee Stadium || Bangkok, Thailand || KO (Left cross) || 2 ||

|-  style="text-align:center; background:#cfc;"
| 1993-10-15 || Win ||align=left| Saenklai Sit Kru Od || Lumpinee Stadium || Bangkok, Thailand || Decision || 5 || 3:00

|-  style="text-align:center; background:#cfc;"
| 1993-08-16 || Win ||align=left| Burklerk Pinsinchai || Rajadamnern Stadium || Bangkok, Thailand || Decision || 5 || 3:00

|-  style="text-align:center; background:#fbb;"
| 1993-05-17 || Loss ||align=left| Saenkeng Pinsinchai || Rajadamnern Stadium || Bangkok, Thailand || Decision || 5 || 3:00

|- style="text-align:center; background:#cfc;"
| 1993-03-03 || Win||align=left| Yodkhunpon Sitraipum || Rajadamnern Stadium ||  Bangkok, Thailand  || Decision || 5 || 3:00

|-  style="text-align:center; background:#fbb;"
| 1993-02-06|| Loss ||align=left| Lakhin Wassandasit || Lumpinee Stadium || Bangkok, Thailand || Decision  || 5 || 3:00

|-  style="text-align:center; background:#fbb;"
| 1993-01-08|| Loss ||align=left| Lakhin Wassandasit || Lumpinee Stadium || Bangkok, Thailand || Decision  || 5 || 3:00

|-  style="text-align:center; background:#fbb;"
| 1992-12-27|| Loss||align=left| Oley Kiatoneway || Lumpinee Stadium || Bangkok, Thailand || Decision || 5 || 3:00

|- style="text-align:center; background:#cfc;"
| ?- || Win||align=left| Pompetch Naratreekul || Lumpinee Stadium ||  Bangkok, Thailand  ||Decision || 5 || 3:00

|- style="text-align:center; background:#fbb;"
| 1992- || Loss ||align=left| Jaroensap Kiatbanchong || Lumpinee Stadium ||  Bangkok, Thailand  ||Decision || 5 || 3:00

|-  style="text-align:center; background:#c5d2ea;"
| 1992- ||No Contest ||align=left| Nungubon Sitlerchai || Lumpinee Stadium || Bangkok, Thailand || ||  ||

|- style="text-align:center; background:#fbb;"
| 1992-07-27 || Loss ||align=left| Kaensak Sor.Ploenjit || Rajadamnern Stadium || Bangkok, Thailand  || Decision || 5 || 3:00

|- style="text-align:center; background:#fbb;"
| 1992-05-05 ||Loss ||align=left| Veeraphol Sahaprom || Lumpinee Stadium ||  Bangkok, Thailand  || Decision || 5 || 3:00

|-  style="text-align:center; background:#cfc;"
| 1992-02- || Win ||align=left| Nungubon Sitlerchai || Lumpinee Stadium || Bangkok, Thailand || Decision || 5 || 3:00

|-  style="text-align:center; background:#cfc;"
| 1992-01-31 ||Win ||align=left| Nungubon Sitlerchai || Lumpinee Stadium || Bangkok, Thailand || Decision || 5 || 3:00

|- style="text-align:center; background:#cfc;"
| ? || Win ||align=left| Josselin Christophe || Crocodile Farm ||  Samut Prakan, Thailand  || Decision ||5 ||3:00

|-  style="text-align:center; background:#fbb;"
| 1991-12-27|| Loss||align=left| Oley Kiatoneway || Lumpinee Stadium || Bangkok, Thailand || Decision || 5 || 3:00

|- style="text-align:center; background:#fbb;"
| 1991-10-25 || Loss||align=left| Tanooin Por.Cheuchart|| Lumpinee Stadium ||  Bangkok, Thailand  || Decision || 5 || 3:00

|-  style="text-align:center; background:#fbb;"
| 1991-09-24|| Loss||align=left| Boonlai Sor.Thanikul || Lumpinee Stadium || Bangkok, Thailand || Decision || 5 || 3:00

|- style="text-align:center; background:#cfc;"
| 1991-09-03 || Win ||align=left| Jaroensap Kiatbanchong  || Lumpinee Stadium ||  Bangkok, Thailand  || Decision ||5 ||3:00

|- style="text-align:center; background:#fbb;"
| 1991-07-16 || Loss ||align=left| Jongsanan Bangkaewluklong || Lumpinee Stadium ||  Bangkok, Thailand  || Decision || 5 || 3:00

|- style="text-align:center; background:#cfc;"
| 1991-05-10 || Win ||align=left| Chainoi Muangsurin || Lumpinee Stadium ||  Bangkok, Thailand  || Decision ||5 ||3:00

|- style="text-align:center; background:#cfc;"
| 1991-03-31 || Win ||align=left| Nungubon Sitlerchai || Lumpinee Stadium ||  Bangkok, Thailand  || Decision ||5 ||3:00

|- style="text-align:center; background:#fbb;"
| 1991-03-05 || Loss ||align=left| Langsuan Panyuthaphum || Lumpinee Stadium ||  Bangkok, Thailand  || Decision || 5 || 3:00

|- style="text-align:center; background:#cfc;"
| 1991-01-25 || Win ||align=left| Karuhat Sor.Supawan || Lumpinee Stadium ||  Bangkok, Thailand  || Decision || 5 || 3:00

|- style="text-align:center; background:#fbb;"
| 1991-01-04 || Loss ||align=left| Namkabuan Nongkeepahuyuth|| Lumpinee Stadium || Bangkok, Thailand  || Decision || 5 || 3:00

|-  style="text-align:center; background:#cfc;"
| 1990-12-11|| Win ||align=left| Rainbow Sor Prantalay || Lumpinee Stadium || Bangkok, Thailand || TKO || 4 ||

|-  style="text-align:center; background:#fbb;"
| 1990-11-20|| Loss||align=left| Wangchannoi Sor Palangchai || Lumpinee Stadium || Bangkok, Thailand || Decision || 5 || 3:00

|-  style="text-align:center; background:#cfc;"
| 1990-10-30|| Win ||align=left| Samranthong Kiatbanchong || Lumpinee Stadium || Bangkok, Thailand || TKO || 2 ||

|-  style="text-align:center; background:#fbb;"
| 1990-09-25|| Loss ||align=left| Oley Kiatoneway || Lumpinee Stadium || Bangkok, Thailand || Decision || 5 || 3:00

|-  style="text-align:center; background:#fbb;"
| 1990-08-07|| Loss||align=left| Oley Kiatoneway || Lumpinee Stadium || Bangkok, Thailand || KO || 3 ||

|-  style="text-align:center; background:#cfc;"
| 1990-07-10|| Win ||align=left| Oley Kiatoneway || Lumpinee Stadium || Bangkok, Thailand || Decision || 5 || 3:00

|- style="text-align:center; background:#cfc;"
| 1990-06-|| Win||align=left| Joel Cesar|| ||  England  || KO || 1||

|- style="text-align:center; background:#cfc;"
| 1990-05-15|| Win||align=left| Boonlai Sor.Thanikul || Lumpinee Stadium ||  Bangkok, Thailand  || Decision || 5 || 3:00

|-  style="text-align:center; background:#fbb;"
| 1990-04-24|| Loss ||align=left| Kangwannoi Or Sribualoi || Lumpinee Stadium || Bangkok, Thailand || Decision || 5 || 3:00

|- style="text-align:center; background:#cfc;"
| 1990-03-30|| Win||align=left| Boonlong Sor.Thanikul || Lumpinee Stadium ||  Bangkok, Thailand  || Decision || 5 || 3:00

|- style="text-align:center; background:#cfc;"
| 1990-03-02 || Win||align=left| Saichon Pichitsuk || Lumpinee Stadium ||  Bangkok, Thailand  || Decision || 5 || 3:00

|- style="text-align:center; background:#cfc;"
| 1990-02-03|| Win||align=left| Leroy Atkinson || ||  London, England  || KO || 3||

|-  style="text-align:center; background:#fbb;"
| 1990-01-20|| Loss ||align=left| Kangwannoi Or.Sribualoi || Lumpinee Stadium || Bangkok, Thailand || Decision || 5 || 3:00

|-  style="text-align:center; background:#cfc;"
| 1989-11-11|| Win ||align=left| Tekin Donmez ||  || Phoenix, Arizona, United States || Decision || 5 ||3:00

|-  style="text-align:center; background:#fbb;"
| 1989-10-17|| Loss ||align=left| Saichon Pichitsuk|| Lumpinee Stadium || Bangkok, Thailand || Decision|| 5 ||3:00

|-  style="text-align:center; background:#fbb;"
| 1989-08-15|| Loss ||align=left| Superlek Sorn E-Sarn || Lumpinee Stadium || Bangkok, Thailand || Decision || 5 || 3:00

|-  style="text-align:center; background:#cfc;"
| 1989-06-30 || Win ||align=left| Grandprixnoi Muangchaiyaphum || Lumpinee Stadium || Bangkok, Thailand || Decision || 5 || 3:00

|-  style="text-align:center; background:#cfc;"
| 1989-06-06 || Win ||align=left| Yopetch Sor.Jitpattana || Lumpinee Stadium || Bangkok, Thailand || Decision || 5 || 3:00

|-  style="text-align:center; background:#fbb;"
| 1989-05-02 || Loss ||align=left| Langsuan Panyuthaphum|| Lumpinee Stadium || Bangkok, Thailand || Decision || 5 || 3:00
|-
! style=background:white colspan=9 |

|-  style="text-align:center; background:#fbb;"
| 1989-03-10 || Loss ||align=left| Noppadet Sor.Rewadee || Lumpinee Stadium || Bangkok, Thailand || Decision  || 5 || 3:00

|-  style="text-align:center; background:#fbb;"
| 1989-01-31 || Loss ||align=left| Samransak Muangsurin || Lumpinee Stadium || Bangkok, Thailand || Decision  || 5 || 3:00

|-  style="text-align:center; background:#cfc;"
| 1988-12-08|| Win||align=left| Phodam Chuwattana || Rajadamnern Stadium || Bangkok, Thailand || Decision || 5 || 3:00

|-  style="text-align:center; background:#cfc;"
| 1988-10-28|| Win||align=left| Thamawit Saksamut || Lumpinee Stadium || Bangkok, Thailand || Decision || 5 || 3:00

|-  style="text-align:center; background:#fbb;"
| 1988-09-27 || Loss ||align=left| Kongtoranee Payakaroon || Lumpinee Stadium || Bangkok, Thailand || Decision || 5 || 3:00

|-  style="text-align:center; background:#fbb;"
| 1988-07-26 || Loss ||align=left| Langsuan Panyuthaphum || Lumpinee Stadium || Bangkok, Thailand || Decision || 5 || 3:00

|-  style="text-align:center; background:#cfc;"
| 1988-05-31|| Win||align=left| Wisanupon Saksamut || Lumpinee Stadium || Bangkok, Thailand || TKO (Corner Stoppage)|| 4 || 
|-
! style=background:white colspan=9 |

|-  style="text-align:center; background:#cfc;"
| 1988-01-26|| Win||align=left| Wangchannoi Sor Palangchai || Lumpinee Stadium || Bangkok, Thailand || Decision || 5 || 3:00
|-
! style=background:white colspan=9 |

|-  style="text-align:center; background:#fbb;"
| 1987-11-27|| Loss ||align=left| Wangchannoi Sor Palangchai || Lumpinee Stadium || Bangkok, Thailand || KO (Punches)||  ||

|-  style="text-align:center; background:#c5d2ea;"
| 1987-10- || Draw ||align=left| Baeber Narupai || Lumpinee Stadium || Bangkok, Thailand || Decision || 5 || 3:00

|-  style="text-align:center; background:#fbb;"
| 1987-09-22 || Loss ||align=left| Langsuan Panyuthaphum || Lumpinee Stadium || Bangkok, Thailand || Decision || 5 || 3:00

|-  style="text-align:center; background:#cfc;"
| 1987-08-28|| Win||align=left| Burklerk Pinsinchai || Lumpinee Stadium || Bangkok, Thailand || Decision || 5 || 3:00
|-
! style=background:white colspan=9 |

|-  style="text-align:center; background:#cfc;"
| 1987-07-24|| Win||align=left| Paruhatlek Sitchunthong || Lumpinee Stadium || Bangkok, Thailand || Decision || 5 || 3:00

|-  style="text-align:center; background:#cfc;"
| 1987-05-19|| Win ||align=left| Eddie Siwatsiripong || Lumpinee Stadium || Bangkok, Thailand || Decision || 5 || 3:00

|-  style="text-align:center; background:#cfc;"
| 1987-03-24|| Win ||align=left| Pungluang Kiatanan || Lumpinee Stadium || Bangkok, Thailand || Decision || 5 || 3:00

|-  style="text-align:center; background:#cfc;"
| 1987-03-|| Win ||align=left| Supernoi Sitchokchai ||  || Udon Thani, Thailand || KO || 4 ||

|-  style="text-align:center; background:#cfc;"
| 1987-02-10|| Win ||align=left| Pungluang Kiatanan || Lumpinee Stadium || Bangkok, Thailand || Decision || 5 || 3:00

|-  style="text-align:center; background:#fbb;"
| 1987-01-13|| Loss ||align=left| Hippy Singmanee || Lumpinee Stadium || Bangkok, Thailand || Decision || 5 || 3:00

|-  style="text-align:center; background:#cfc;"
| 1986-12-10|| Win ||align=left| Bookerd Fairtex || Huamark Stadium || Bangkok, Thailand || Decision || 5 || 3:00

|-  style="text-align:center; background:#cfc;"
| 1986-10-24|| Win||align=left| Morakot Sor Tamarangsri || Lumpinee Stadium || Bangkok, Thailand || Decision || 5 || 3:00

|-  style="text-align:center; background:#cfc;"
| 1986-09-30|| Win||align=left| Morakot Sor Tamarangsri || Lumpinee Stadium || Bangkok, Thailand || Decision || 5 || 3:00

|-  style="text-align:center; background:#fbb;"
| 1986-09-09|| Loss||align=left| Hippy Singmanee || Lumpinee Stadium || Bangkok, Thailand || Decision || 5 || 3:00
|-
! style=background:white colspan=9 |

|-  style="text-align:center; background:#fbb;"
| 1986-07-30|| Loss||align=left| Jaroenthong Kiatbanchong || Lumpinee Stadium || Bangkok, Thailand || Decision || 5 || 3:00

|-  style="text-align:center; background:#cfc;"
| 1986-07-11|| Win ||align=left| Seksan Sitchomthong || Lumpinee Stadium || Bangkok, Thailand || Decision || 5 || 3:00

|-  style="text-align:center; background:#cfc;"
| 1986-06-03|| Win ||align=left| Seksan Sitchomthong || Lumpinee Stadium || Bangkok, Thailand || Decision || 5 || 3:00

|-  style="text-align:center; background:#cfc;"
| 1986-03-28|| Win ||align=left| Wanthongchai Payasakda|| Lumpinee Stadium || Bangkok, Thailand || KO || 4 ||

|-  style="text-align:center; background:#fbb;"
| 1986-03-04|| Loss ||align=left| Haodon Sor.Tassanee || Lumpinee Stadium || Bangkok, Thailand || Decision || 5 || 3:00

|-  style="text-align:center; background:#cfc;"
| 1986-01-31|| Win ||align=left| Boonthieng Bualuangprakanp̣hay || Lumpinee Stadium || Bangkok, Thailand || Decision || 5 || 3:00

|-  style="text-align:center; background:#fbb;"
| 1985-10-18|| Loss ||align=left| Boonmee Sitsuchon || Lumpinee Stadium || Bangkok, Thailand || Decision || 5 || 3:00

|-  style="text-align:center; background:#fbb;"
| 1985-09-20|| Loss ||align=left| Pairojnoi Sor Siamchai || Lumpinee Stadium || Bangkok, Thailand || Decision || 5 || 3:00

|-  style="text-align:center; background:#cfc;"
| 1985-06-22|| Win ||align=left| Boonmee Sitsuchon || Lumpinee Stadium || Bangkok, Thailand || Decision || 5 || 3:00
|-
! style=background:white colspan=9 |

|-  style="text-align:center; background:#cfc;"
| 1985-05-21|| Win ||align=left| Boonmee Sitsuchon || Lumpinee Stadium || Bangkok, Thailand || Decision || 5 || 3:00
|-
! style=background:white colspan=9 |

|-  style="text-align:center; background:#fbb;"
| 1985-04-26|| Loss ||align=left| Kley Sor.Ploenchit || Lumpinee Stadium || Bangkok, Thailand || Decision || 5 || 3:00
|-
! style=background:white colspan=9 |

|-  style="text-align:center; background:#cfc;"
| 1985-03-30|| Win ||align=left| Hanunoi Sor.Ploenchit || Lumpinee Stadium || Bangkok, Thailand || Decision || 5 || 3:00

|-  style="text-align:center; background:#cfc;"
| 1985-02-22|| Win ||align=left| Kittichai Sor.Ploenchit || Lumpinee Stadium || Bangkok, Thailand || Decision || 5 || 3:00

|-  style="text-align:center; background:#cfc;"
| 1985-01-11|| Win ||align=left| Supermin Kiatwangkham || Lumpinee Stadium || Bangkok, Thailand || Decision || 5 || 3:00
|-
! style=background:white colspan=9 |

|-  style="text-align:center; background:#cfc;"
| 1984-12-04|| Win ||align=left| Pansuriya Hor.Mahachai || || Bangkok, Thailand || Decision || 5 || 3:00
|-
! style=background:white colspan=9 |

|-  style="text-align:center; background:#cfc;"
| 1984-11-03|| Win ||align=left| Theppabut Luktafah || || Bangkok, Thailand || Decision || 5 || 3:00

|-  style="text-align:center; background:#fbb;"
| 1984-10-12|| Win ||align=left| Liktisit Sor.Jitpattana|| || Bangkok, Thailand || Decision || 5 || 3:00

|-  style="text-align:center; background:#cfc;"
| 1984-09-04|| Win ||align=left| Winainoi Chor Wichannoi || || Bangkok, Thailand || Decision || 5 || 3:00
|-
|-
| colspan=9 | Legend:

References

1968 births
2020 deaths
Dokmaipa Por Pongsawang
Dokmaipa Por Pongsawang